Foetorepus is a genus of dragonets.  The validity of this genus has been questioned with some experts regarding it as a junior synonym of Synchiropus.

Species
There are currently 11 recognized species in this genus:
 Foetorepus agassizii (Goode & T. H. Bean, 1888) (Spotfin dragonet)
 Foetorepus altivelis (Temminck & Schlegel, 1845) (Red dragonet)
 Foetorepus apricus (McCulloch, 1926)
 Foetorepus australis Nakabo & McKay, 1989
 Foetorepus calauropomus (J. Richardson, 1844) (Common stinkfish)
 Foetorepus dagmarae (R. Fricke, 1985)
 Foetorepus garthi (Seale, 1940)
 Foetorepus masudai Nakabo, 1987
 Foetorepus paxtoni (R. Fricke, 2000)
 Foetorepus phasis (Günther, 1880) (Bight stinkfish)
 Foetorepus talarae (Hildebrand & F. O. Barton, 1949)

References

Callionymidae
Taxa named by Gilbert Percy Whitley
Marine fish genera